Günther Noll (born 24 August 1927) is a German music educator and university faculty.

Education and professional career 
Noll was born in Staßfurt.

During his subsequent time as a research assistant and lecturer at the Humboldt University of Berlin, he was awarded a doctorate in music education by Fritz Reuter at the Faculty of Education in 1960 with the dissertation Untersuchungen über die musikerzieherische Bedeutung Jean-Jacques Rousseaus und seine Ideen. Allgemeiner Überblick und spezielle Darstellung seiner Ziffernschrift als Anfang einer modernen Musikmethodik. Ein Beitrag zu ihrer Geschichte PhD. In 1961, he moved to the Federal Republic of Germany. There he became a research assistant to the Deutscher Musikrat in the Liaison Office for Intergovernmental Relations (Cologne 1962–1964). After a lectureship at the University of Wuppertal (1973-1974), he was appointed full professor of music and its didactics with a focus on musical folklore at the Neuss department of the Pädagogische Hochschule Rheinland in 1976 and director of the Institute for Musical Folklore. With the transfer of the Neuss department to the University of Düsseldorf in 1980, he began teaching there. In 1985, he was called to the University of Cologne and in 1986 also was transferred of the Institute for Musical Folklore. In 1992 he became emeritus.

Activity 
Extensive artistic activity as choirmaster and ensemble leader at schools and colleges, numerous concerts and events, especially with the Folklore Ensemble Bonn 1966–1976. Leader of teacher training weeks, speaker at numerous conferences and congresses, also abroad. Initiator and co-founder of the working group "Research in Music Education" (today: "Arbeitskreis Musikpädagogische Forschung e.V."), many years on the board. First spokesperson of the Bundesfachgruppe Musikpädagogik (association of music teacher training institutions) in 1972–1975, board member from 1985 to 1989, conference leader. Collaborator in university curricular subject group commissions, member of expert commissions of the Deutscher Musikrat. From 1975 to 1980 editor and co-editor of the scientific journals Musik und Bildung and Forschung in der Musikerziehung, 1979-1992 editor of ad marginem. From 1980 to 1984 Chairman of the Fachgruppe Musikpädagogik Nordrhein and 2nd Chairman of the Landesfachgruppe NRW.

Honours 
 Presentation of the Medal of Honour of the University of Nantes (1983) 
 Verdienstorden der Bundesrepublik Deutschland am Bande (2 November 1995).
 Festschrift (2002)

Work 
 Musikalische Volkskultur im Rheinland : aktuelle Forschungsbeiträge : Bericht über die Jahrestagung 1991.
 Liedbegleitsätze für das Klassenmusizieren mit Orff- und anderen Schlaginstrumenten.

Further reading 
 Gisela Probst-Effah (ed.): Musikalische Volkskunde und Musikpädagogik: Annäherungen und Schnittmengen. Festschrift für Günther Noll zum 75. Geburtstag. Essen: Die Blaue Eule, 2002. 
 50 Jahre musikethnologische Forschung. Institut für Musikalische Volkskunde (1964–2010). Institut für Europäische Musikethnologie (since 2010). Published by Klaus Näumann, Günther Noll, Gisela Probst-Effah, Astrid Reimers, Wilhelm Schepping und Reinhard Schneider. Cologne 2014 /download

References

External links 
 
 
 

German music educators
Academic staff of the University of Cologne
Recipients of the Cross of the Order of Merit of the Federal Republic of Germany
1927 births
Living people
People from Staßfurt